Fluperlapine (NB 106-689), also known as fluoroperlapine, is a morphanthridine (11H-dibenzo[b,e]azepine) atypical antipsychotic with additional antidepressant and sedative effects. It was first synthesized in 1979, and then subsequently studied in animals and humans in 1984 and beyond, but despite demonstrating efficacy in the treatment of a variety of medical conditions including schizophrenia, psychosis associated with Parkinson's disease, depressive symptoms, and dystonia, it was never marketed.
This was perhaps due to its capacity for producing potentially life-threatening agranulocytosis, similarly to clozapine, which it closely resembles both structurally and pharmacologically.

Pharmacology
Binding profile

Synthesis

3-fluoro-5,11-dihydro-6H-dibenz[b,e]azepin-6-one [62662-88-8] (3)

See also 
 Clozapine
 Perlapine

References 

Antipsychotics
Dibenzazepines
Muscarinic antagonists
Piperazines
Sedatives
Tricyclic antidepressants
Substances discovered in the 1970s